"Stand Up" is a song by Ludacris, released as the second official single in 2003, and taken from his fourth album, Chicken-n-Beer. It was his first number-one single, with production by Kanye West and co-production by Ludacris himself.

The song topped the Billboard Hot 100 for the week of December 6, 2003, and topped the R&B/Hip-Hop singles chart for four weeks, making it the rapper's first number one on both charts respectively. Stand Up spent a total of 28 weeks on the Hot 100. Ludacris went on to be nominated for a Grammy Award for Best Rap Solo Performance.

The song made a reappearance in a commercial for the all-new 2019 Mercedes-Benz A Class Sedan that appeared during Super Bowl LIII on February 3, 2019. The commercial featured Ludacris himself performing the song at an opera, and also featured Wile E. Coyote and the Road Runner and Free Willy.

Music video 
A music video was made for the song, directed by Dave Meyers. Ludacris raps at a night club with many bizarre elements, such as a huge beer bottle, which he drinks from, a giant sneaker that he later wears, disabled people in wheelchairs dancing, a woman whose behind grows to a humungous proportion after kissing Luda, Luda and another woman as toddlers, and much more, with scenes mostly alluding to the song's lyrics. Chingy, Katt Williams, 2 Chainz, Scooter Braun,  Kanye West (the song's producer), Tyra Banks & Lauren London made cameo appearances on the video.

Charts

Weekly charts

Year-end charts

Decade-end charts

Certifications

Remixes and cover versions 
An official remix was also recorded, in which Ludacris' third verse was removed and replaced with a verse from Kanye West. The remix appeared on the Akademiks: JeaniusLevelMusikKanye West Vol. 2 & Kon The Louis Vuitton Don mixtapes.

Richard Cheese and Lounge Against the Machine covered the song as a lounge-style version on his 2004 album I'd Like a Virgin.

Ludacris also made a remix of the song for the Atlanta Falcons.

Ludacris used this song to mix it with "Sweet Dreams (Are Made of This)" in a faster tone in some club radio stations.

References

External links 

2003 singles
2004 singles
Ludacris songs
Shawnna songs
Billboard Hot 100 number-one singles
Music videos directed by Dave Meyers (director)
Song recordings produced by Kanye West
Songs written by Ludacris
Songs written by Kanye West
2003 songs